Deshabandu Ranjan Senerath Madugalle (born 22 April 1959) is a former Sri Lankan cricketer who currently serves as the Chief of the panel of ICC match referees. He was educated at Trinity College, Kandy, and Royal College, Colombo.

He represented Sri Lanka in international cricket between 1979 and 1988, making his debut in the 1979 ICC Trophy final against Canada. He had the honor of being in the first Sri Lankan Test team in 1982, and top-scored in the first innings with 65 – making a 99-run partnership with Arjuna Ranatunga. Madugalle represented Sri Lanka in 21 test matches and 63 One Day Internationals and also captained Sri Lanka national cricket team in two test matches and 13 ODIs.

Madugalle retired from international cricket in 1988 at the age of 29. Subsequently, he has become a match referee for the International Cricket Council in 1993 and currently serves as the chief of the panel of ICC match referees. He was promoted to the position of chief match referee of the ICC in 2001 in which he achieved record longevity but courted controversy at times by exhibiting bias against Asian teams.

ODI career 
Madugalle continued as a vital part of the Sri Lankan Test and ODI team, only missing one international game between 1979 and 1984. However, his ODI performances worried the Sri Lankan selectors, with only one fifty from 25 innings. He was shuffled around the order in an attempt to gain some form, but after scoring a duck in the second and last ODI against New Zealand in 1984, he was dropped for the first three matches of the 1984–85 World Series Cup in Australia. A couple of seasons followed where he was in and out of the team, but a major reorganisation of the squad following the tour of India in 1986–87 gave him the chance again, and he seized it with a Test 60 against New Zealand.

Performance outside Sri Lanka 
Madugalle was never a good tourist, only averaging 21.50 with the bat abroad, while he averaged 42.76 on traditionally tricky Sri Lankan pitches. Indeed, his only century came in a home match – the first match of the 3-Test series against India in 1985. Madugalle took nearly seven hours to forge his 103, but it ensured in a drawn match. In the next match, he only batted once, making 54 from number three to build a solid platform for the next batsmen, which eventually led to a comfortable 149-run victory. They drew the third Test – despite scores of 5 and 10 from Madugalle, and Sri Lanka had won their first Test series.

Performance as captain
In 1988 he was appointed captain of the Sri Lankan cricket team, but his team troubled neither Australia, nor England under Madugalle's leadership. Madugalle himself recorded four sub-20 scores as captain, and the two Tests he captained became his last. He also captained the ODI team in his last 13 matches, winning two and losing eleven, but again he failed to back up his captaincy with runs – only passing 25 twice. However, Sri Lanka did win in his very last match, with a five-wicket win over Pakistan in the 1988 Asia Cup – in which Madugalle did not bat.

He also played league cricket in England – particularly in 1979 for Flowery Field Cricket Club, who were then in the Saddleworth League.

Retirement and match referee
Madugalle only made two international fifties after the '85 India series, both in Tests, and eventually he retired to become a marketing executive in a multinational corporation. But the lure of the cricket grounds became too strong, and he became involved as a match referee in 1993. He progressed through the International Cricket Council ranks, refereeing 77 Test matches and 169 ODIs. Thus, he has officiated in many more international matches than he has played. In 2001, he was appointed as the chief match referee by the ICC. In addition to being seen as an establishment man, his record in being impartial has been questioned – when to seem fair rather than act fair, he was harsh on Asian teams while being relatively light on Australian teams.

Ranjan Madugalle set the record for becoming the first match referee to officially take part in 300+ ODIs. He still holds the record for being a match referee in most ODIs.(304)

He too has the record for becoming the first match referee to officially take part in 100+ Tests. In fact, he's the only match referee in test history to take part in 100 as well as 150 test matches. He still holds the record for being a match referee in most test matches. (175)

He also holds the record for being a match referee in most T20I matches.(85)

Ranjan Madugalle has officially been a match referee in most international cricket matches(564) and also he's the only match referee to be involved in 500 as well as 550 international matches.

In 2019, Ranjan Madugalle officiated as the match referee of the 2019 Cricket World Cup final.

Controversies
During his tenure as a referee, Ranjan Madugalle courted controversy at times by exhibiting bias against Asian teams the most notable incidents of which occurred during the Indian tour of Australia in 1999–2000.

See also
 Elite Panel of ICC Referees

References

External links
 Cricinfo – meet the match referee (retrieved 17 August 2005)
 Abusive Pointing in 1999–2000 scot free by Umpires and Referee From Rediff.com
 Ranjan Madugalle : The unforgetful Lankan From Cricinfo.com, September 2006
 Sauce for the goose From Rediff.com
 Madugalle faces flak for letting off Johnson From Mid-Day.com

1959 births
Living people
Nondescripts Cricket Club cricketers
Sri Lanka One Day International cricketers
Sri Lanka Test cricketers
Sri Lankan cricketers
Sri Lanka Test cricket captains
Alumni of Royal College, Colombo
Alumni of Trinity College, Kandy
Cricket match referees
Cricketers from Kandy
Deshabandu